The economy of Aruba is an open system, with tourism currently providing the largest percentage of the country's income.  Because of tourism's rapid growth in the last 80 years, related industries like construction have also flourished in Aruba.  Other primary industries include oil refining and storage, as well as offshore banking.  Despite the island's low rainfall in the past year, the people have proven that Aruba's soil is full of nutrients and many crops do amazingly well in the soil. Many more locals have started participating more to horticulture, permaculture and agriculture. Creating a start to an internal economy. Aloe cultivation, livestock, and fishing also contribute to Aruba's economy.  In addition, the country also exports art and collectibles, machinery, electrical equipment, and transport equipment.  Aruba's small labor force and low unemployment rate have led to many unfilled job vacancies, despite sharp rises in wage rates in recent years.

With such a large part of its economy dependent on tourism, a few political parties are striving   to increase business in other sectors to protect against possible industry slumps to prevent another economic shut-down like what was experienced during 2020.  Their current focus is on expanding into the cannabis and hemp industry, transitioning to a Circular Economy, creating an internal economy in the primary sector, technology, and finance.

History 
Unlike many Caribbean islands, a plantation economy never developed on Aruba due to its arid climate.  Early Spanish explorers considered the island of little value, partly because the poor soil made growing crops difficult and partly because their attempts to find gold turned up empty-handed.  However, long after the Dutch obtained control of Aruba, they found the gold the Spanish had been seeking.

Gold 
With the discovery of gold on Aruba in 1800, mining became the island's foremost industry.  Aruba's economy boomed.  However, by 1916 the gold supply had mostly been tapped out, making it impossible for companies to turn a profit.  As the gold mining industry waned, so did the economy.

Aloe 
First planted on Aruba in 1850, aloes throve in its desert conditions. With a healthy demand for aloe products, it became an important part of Aruba's economy. In fact, for many years, the country was aloe's top exporter. But over the years, many aloe fields were replaced by buildings, diminishing its production and exports declined.

The oldest company on the island, Aruba Aloe, has recently instituted changes in the hopes of becoming Aruba's leading product manufacturer. It built a new, modern facility, an aloe museum, and designed new packaging. Although most of their product line sells in the national market, a 2005 exporting deal with a U.S. company and sales through their website have increased their international market.

Oil 
Despite setbacks caused by the troubled gold and aloe industries, Aruba's economy didn't suffer long.  Because of its location near Venezuela, the island became an attractive spot for oil refineries.  The Lago Oil and Transport Company, owned by Standard Oil of New Jersey (now Exxon), opened in 1929 near the transshipping port of San Nicolaas.  Following in their footsteps, the Eagle Oil Refinery opened soon after.  Over the next few decades, the oil industry took over as Aruba's primary economic force.

With the United States entry into World War II in 1942 the demand for Aviation gasoline further increased and considerable expansion was done at the Lago Refinery soon after the United States entered the war. With this expansion, Lago became one of the largest refineries in the world, only bested by Royal Dutch Shell Isla refinery on Curaçao, and a major producer of petroleum products for the Allied war efforts. Due to mistakes by the German deck gunner the refinery was not damaged but three of the Lago tankers were torpedoed in San Nicolaas harbour.

The Eagle Oil Refinery shut down and was dismantled in the late 1950s.  But the Lago refinery kept going until 1985, when the demand for oil fell and Exxon closed it. In 1991, the Coastal Corporation bought it, scaled down operations, and reopened it. Coastal later sold the refinery to Valero Energy Corporation in 2004. Its reopening didn't raise Aruba's oil industry to its previous heights although it did revive that sector and continued to be a key contributor to the country's economy until 2009 when it was closed.  In December 2010, Valero Energy announced plans to reopen the refinery.

Tourism 

In 1947, Aruba's government founded a tourist board to explore the possibility of developing a tourism industry.  Several years later, cruise ships began to dock in Oranjestad, Aruba's capital city.  The island's first luxury hotel was built in 1959, giving the fledgling industry a good start.  Over the years, tourism grew and helped create a prosperous economy.

As the oil industry waned, tourism increased in importance.  The government offered fiscal incentives to spur growth of hotels and other tourist-oriented businesses.  Their efforts resulted in a steady and rapid rise in tourism. When a surplus of these jobs couldn't be filled, they placed a one-year moratorium on new hotel construction and new tourist corporations.

Following the September 11 attacks, tourism temporarily declined because of grounded flights and travel fears.  Aruba stepped up its visible security force in tourist areas to heighten safety and reassure visitors.
After a short time, tourism rebounded strongly.

Another potential threat to the industry occurred in 2005, when the May 30 disappearance of vacationing Alabama teen Natalee Holloway made international news.  Claiming that Aruban authorities weren't taking the case seriously enough, her mother and the Governor of Alabama called for a nationwide boycott of Aruba.  However, the U.S. federal government didn't back the proposed boycott.  Aruba's reputation as one of the safest islands in the Caribbean may have helped it overcome any negative stigma caused by the case.  The amount of tourism in June, 2005, actually rose by 9% from the previous year.

References 

Aruba.com - Official Government Website
CIA World Factbook - Aruba

See also 

 Economy of the Caribbean
 Aruban florin
 Central Bank of Aruba
 Central banks and currencies of the Caribbean
 Euronext
 List of countries by credit rating
 List of Latin American and Caribbean countries by GDP growth
 List of Latin American and Caribbean countries by GDP (nominal)
 List of Latin American and Caribbean countries by GDP (PPP)
 List of countries by tax revenue as percentage of GDP
 List of countries by future gross government debt
 List of countries by leading trade partners